The silvertip tetra (Hasemania nana) is a species of characid freshwater fish native to streams and creeks in the São Francisco basin in Brazil, but frequently kept in aquariums. Silvertip tetras are slightly more aggressive than other comparable smaller tetras, observed occasionally to nip other similarly sized tetras.

Description
The males have a copper color, the females are more pale and silvery. Both have white tips on the fins, hence the name. They differ from most other tetras by lacking a small second dorsal (adipose) fin. Silvertip tetras have a black area at the base of their caudal fin. The fish are transparent except for the fact that their bodies have an overall copper sheen. During the night, the copper and black become silver as the fish rests — the color is reactivated once the fish becomes active in the morning. Other than coloration, sexual dimorphism is slight, the female having a very slightly larger belly. 
These tropical, freshwater fish thrive in temperatures that range from 71°F - 82°F (22°C - 28°C). The silvertip tetra lives in slightly acidic waters that range from a pH of 6.0 - 8.0. These fish like to be kept in schools of 5 or more fish. When held in captivity, the silvertip tetra needs a tank size with a minimum of around 50 litres (10 gallons).

References

External links
Aquatic Community

Characidae
Fish of South America
Fish of Brazil
Tetras
Taxa named by Christian Frederik Lütken
Fish described in 1875